Following is a list of some mathematically well-defined shapes.

Algebraic curves
Cubic plane curve
Quartic plane curve

Rational curves

Degree 2
Conic sections
Unit circle
Unit hyperbola

Degree 3

Folium of Descartes
Cissoid of Diocles
Conchoid of de Sluze
Right strophoid
Semicubical parabola
Serpentine curve
Trident curve
Trisectrix of Maclaurin
Tschirnhausen cubic
Witch of Agnesi

Degree 4

Ampersand curve
Bean curve
Bicorn
Bow curve
Bullet-nose curve
Cruciform curve
Deltoid curve
Devil's curve
Hippopede
Kampyle of Eudoxus
Kappa curve
Lemniscate of Booth
Lemniscate of Gerono
Lemniscate of Bernoulli
Limaçon
Cardioid
Limaçon trisectrix
Trifolium curve

Degree 5
Quintic of l'Hospital

Degree 6
Astroid
Atriphtaloid
Nephroid
Quadrifolium

Families of variable degree
Epicycloid
Epispiral 
Epitrochoid
Hypocycloid
Lissajous curve
Poinsot's spirals 
Rational normal curve
Rose curve

Curves of genus one
Bicuspid curve
Cassini oval
Cassinoide
Cubic curve
Elliptic curve
Watt's curve

Curves with genus greater than one
Butterfly curve
Elkies trinomial curves
Hyperelliptic curve
Klein quartic
Classical modular curve
Bolza surface
Macbeath surface

Curve families with variable genus
Polynomial lemniscate
Fermat curve
Sinusoidal spiral 
Superellipse
Hurwitz surface

Transcendental curves
Bowditch curve
Brachistochrone
Butterfly curve
Catenary
Clélies
Cochleoid
Cycloid
Horopter
Isochrone
Isochrone of Huygens (Tautochrone)
Isochrone of Leibniz
Isochrone of Varignon
Lamé curve
Pursuit curve
Rhumb line
Spirals 
Archimedean spiral
Cornu spiral 
Cotes' spiral
Fermat's spiral 
Galileo's spiral
Hyperbolic spiral 
Lituus 
Logarithmic spiral 
Nielsen's spiral 
Syntractrix
Tractrix
Trochoid

Piecewise constructions
Bézier curve
Splines
B-spline
Nonuniform rational B-spline
Ogee
Loess curve
Lowess
Polygonal curve
Maurer rose
Reuleaux triangle
Bézier triangle

Curves generated by other curves

Caustic including Catacaustic and Diacaustic
Cissoid
Conchoid
Evolute
Glissette
Inverse curve
Involute
Isoptic including Orthoptic
Orthotomic
Negative pedal curve
Pedal curve
Parallel curve
Radial curve
Roulette
Strophoid

Space curves
Conchospiral
Helix
Tendril perversion (a transition between back-to-back helices)
Hemihelix, a quasi-helical shape characterized by multiple tendril perversions
Seiffert's spiral
Slinky spiral
Twisted cubic
Viviani's curve

Surfaces in 3-space

Plane
Quadric surfaces
Cone
Cylinder
Ellipsoid
Spheroid
Sphere
Hyperboloid
Paraboloid
Bicylinder
Tricylinder
Möbius strip
Torus

Minimal surfaces
 Catalan's minimal surface
 Costa's minimal surface
 Catenoid
 Enneper surface
 Gyroid
 Helicoid
 Lidinoid
 Riemann's minimal surface
 Saddle tower
 Scherk surface
 Schwarz minimal surface
 Triply periodic minimal surface

Non-orientable surfaces

Klein bottle
Real projective plane
Cross-cap
Roman surface
Boy's surface

Quadrics 

Sphere
Spheroid
Oblate spheroid
Cone
Ellipsoid
Hyperboloid of one sheet
Hyperboloid of two sheets
Hyperbolic paraboloid (a ruled surface)
Paraboloid
Sphericon
Oloid

Pseudospherical surfaces
Dini's surface
Pseudosphere

Algebraic surfaces
See the list of algebraic surfaces.
 Cayley cubic
 Barth sextic
 Clebsch cubic
 Monkey saddle (saddle-like surface for 3 legs.)
 Torus
 Dupin cyclide (inversion of a torus)
 Whitney umbrella

Miscellaneous surfaces
 Right conoid (a ruled surface)

Fractals

 Apollonian gasket
 Apollonian sphere packing
 Blancmange curve
 Cantor dust
 Cantor set
 Cantor tesseract
 Circle inversion fractal
 De Rham curve
 Douady rabbit
 Dragon curve
 Fibonacci word fractal
 Flame fractal
 Fractal curve
 Gosper curve
 Gosper island
 H-fractal
 Hénon map
 Hexaflake
 Hilbert curve
 Ikeda map attractor
 Iterated function system
 Jerusalem cube
 Julia set
 Koch curve
 Koch snowflake
 L-system
 Lévy C curve
 Feigenbaum attractor
 Lorenz attractor
 Lyapunov fractal
 Mandelbrot set
 Mandelbrot tree
 Mandelbulb
 Menger sponge
 Monkeys tree
 Moore curve
 N-flake
 Pascal triangle
 Peano curve
 Penrose tiling
 Pinwheel tiling
 Pythagoras tree
 Rauzy fractal
 Rössler attractor
 Sierpiński arrowhead curve
 Sierpinski carpet
 Sierpiński curve
 Sierpinski triangle
 Smith–Volterra–Cantor set
 T-square
 Takagi or Blancmange curve
 Triflake
 Vicsek fractal
 von Koch curve
 Weierstrass function
 Z-order curve

Random fractals

 von Koch curve with random interval
 von Koch curve with random orientation
 polymer shapes
 diffusion-limited aggregation
 Self-avoiding random walk
 Brownian motion
 Lichtenberg figure
 Percolation theory
 Multiplicative cascade

Regular polytopes
This table shows a summary of regular polytope counts by dimension.

There are no nonconvex Euclidean regular tessellations in any number of dimensions.

Polytope elements
The elements of a polytope can be considered according to either their own dimensionality or how many dimensions "down" they are from the body.

Vertex, a 0-dimensional element
Edge, a 1-dimensional element
Face, a 2-dimensional element
Cell, a 3-dimensional element
Hypercell or Teron, a 4-dimensional element
Facet, an (n-1)-dimensional element
Ridge, an (n-2)-dimensional element
Peak, an (n-3)-dimensional element

For example, in a polyhedron (3-dimensional polytope), a face is a facet, an edge is a ridge, and a vertex is a peak.

Vertex figure: not itself an element of a polytope, but a diagram showing how the elements meet.

Tessellations

The classical convex polytopes may be considered tessellations, or tilings, of spherical space. Tessellations of euclidean and hyperbolic space may also be considered regular polytopes. Note that an 'n'-dimensional polytope actually tessellates a space of one dimension less. For example, the (three-dimensional) platonic solids tessellate the 'two'-dimensional 'surface' of the sphere.

Zero dimension
Point

One-dimensional regular polytope
There is only one polytope in 1 dimension, whose boundaries are the two endpoints of a line segment, represented by the empty Schläfli symbol {}.

Two-dimensional regular polytopes 
Polygon
Equilateral
Cyclic polygon

Convex polygon
Star polygon
Pentagram

Convex

Regular polygon
Equilateral triangle
Simplex
Square
Cross-polytope
Hypercube
Pentagon
Hexagon
Heptagon
Octagon
Enneagon
Decagon
Hendecagon
Dodecagon
Tridecagon
Tetradecagon
Pentadecagon
Hexadecagon
Heptadecagon
Octadecagon
Enneadecagon
Icosagon
Hectogon
Chiliagon
Regular polygon

Degenerate (spherical) 
Monogon
Digon

Non-convex
star polygon
Pentagram
Heptagram
Octagram
Enneagram
Decagram

Tessellation
Apeirogon

Three-dimensional regular polytopes 
polyhedron

Convex
Platonic solid
Tetrahedron, the 3-space Simplex
Cube, the 3-space hypercube
Octahedron, the 3-space Cross-polytope
Dodecahedron
Icosahedron

Degenerate (spherical) 
hosohedron
dihedron
henagon

Non-convex
Kepler–Poinsot polyhedra
Small stellated dodecahedron
Great dodecahedron
Great stellated dodecahedron
Great icosahedron

Tessellations

Euclidean tilings 

Square tiling
Triangular tiling
Hexagonal tiling
Apeirogon
Dihedron

Hyperbolic tilings 

Lobachevski plane
Hyperbolic tiling

Hyperbolic star-tilings 

Order-7 heptagrammic tiling
Heptagrammic-order heptagonal tiling
Order-9 enneagrammic tiling
Enneagrammic-order enneagonal tiling

Four-dimensional regular polytopes 
convex regular 4-polytope
5-cell, the 4-space Simplex
8-cell, the 4-space Hypercube
16-cell, the 4-space Cross-polytope
24-cell
120-cell
600-cell

Degenerate (spherical) 
Ditope
Hosotope
3-sphere

Non-convex
Star or (Schläfli–Hess) regular 4-polytope
Icosahedral 120-cell
Small stellated 120-cell
Great 120-cell
Grand 120-cell
Great stellated 120-cell
Grand stellated 120-cell
Great grand 120-cell
Great icosahedral 120-cell
Grand 600-cell
Great grand stellated 120-cell

Tessellations of Euclidean 3-space
Honeycomb
Cubic honeycomb

Degenerate tessellations of Euclidean 3-space
Hosohedron
Dihedron
Order-2 apeirogonal tiling
Apeirogonal hosohedron
Order-4 square hosohedral honeycomb
Order-6 triangular hosohedral honeycomb
Hexagonal hosohedral honeycomb
Order-2 square tiling honeycomb
Order-2 triangular tiling honeycomb
Order-2 hexagonal tiling honeycomb

Tessellations of hyperbolic 3-space
Order-4 dodecahedral honeycomb
Order-5 dodecahedral honeycomb
Order-5 cubic honeycomb
Icosahedral honeycomb
Order-3 icosahedral honeycomb
Order-4 octahedral honeycomb
Triangular tiling honeycomb
Square tiling honeycomb
Order-4 square tiling honeycomb
Order-6 tetrahedral honeycomb
Order-6 cubic honeycomb
Order-6 dodecahedral honeycomb
Hexagonal tiling honeycomb
Order-4 hexagonal tiling honeycomb
Order-5 hexagonal tiling honeycomb
Order-6 hexagonal tiling honeycomb

Five-dimensional regular polytopes and higher 
5-polytope
Honeycomb
Tetracomb

Tessellations of Euclidean 4-space
honeycombs
Tesseractic honeycomb
16-cell honeycomb
24-cell honeycomb

Tessellations of Euclidean 5-space and higher
Hypercubic honeycomb
sb
Square tiling
Cubic honeycomb
Tesseractic honeycomb
5-cube honeycomb
6-cube honeycomb
7-cube honeycomb
8-cube honeycomb
Hypercubic honeycomb

Tessellations of hyperbolic 4-space
honeycombs
Order-5 5-cell honeycomb
120-cell honeycomb
Order-5 tesseractic honeycomb
Order-4 120-cell honeycomb
Order-5 120-cell honeycomb
Order-4 24-cell honeycomb
Cubic honeycomb honeycomb
Small stellated 120-cell honeycomb
Pentagrammic-order 600-cell honeycomb
Order-5 icosahedral 120-cell honeycomb
Great 120-cell honeycomb

Tessellations of hyperbolic 5-space

5-orthoplex honeycomb
24-cell honeycomb honeycomb
16-cell honeycomb honeycomb
Order-4 24-cell honeycomb honeycomb
Tesseractic honeycomb honeycomb

Apeirotopes 

 Apeirotope
 Apeirogon
 Apeirohedron
 Regular skew polyhedron

Abstract polytopes 

 Abstract polytope
 11-cell
 57-cell

2D with 1D surface
 Convex polygon
 Concave polygon
 Constructible polygon
 Cyclic polygon
 Equiangular polygon
 Equilateral polygon
 Regular polygon
 Penrose tile
 Polyform
 Balbis
Gnomon
Golygon
 Star without crossing lines
 Star polygon
 Hexagram
 Star of David
 Heptagram
 Octagram
 Star of Lakshmi
 Decagram
 Pentagram

Polygons named for their number of sides

 Monogon — 1 sided
 Digon — 2 sided
 Triangle
 Acute triangle
 Equilateral triangle
 Isosceles triangle
 Obtuse triangle
 Rational triangle
 Right triangle
 30-60-90 triangle
 Isosceles right triangle
 Kepler triangle
 Scalene triangle
 Quadrilateral
 Cyclic quadrilateral
square
 kite
 Parallelogram
 Rhombus (equilateral parallelogram)
 Lozenge
 Rhomboid
 Rectangle
 square (regular quadrilateral)
 Tangential quadrilateral
 Trapezoid or trapezium
 Isosceles trapezoid
 Pentagon
 Regular pentagon
 Hexagon
 Lemoine hexagon
 Heptagon
 Octagon
 Regular octagon
 Nonagon
 Decagon
 Regular decagon
 Hendecagon
 Dodecagon
Triskaidecagon
Tetradecagon
Pentadecagon
Hexadecagon
Heptadecagon
Octadecagon
Enneadecagon
 Icosagon
Triacontagon
Tetracontagon
Pentacontagon
Hexacontagon
Heptacontagon
Octacontagon
Enneacontagon
Hectogon
257-gon
Chiliagon
Myriagon
65537-gon
Megagon
Apeirogon

Tilings
List of uniform tilings
Uniform tilings in hyperbolic plane
Archimedean tiling
Square tiling
Triangular tiling
Hexagonal tiling
Truncated square tiling
Snub square tiling
Trihexagonal tiling
Truncated hexagonal tiling
Rhombitrihexagonal tiling
Truncated trihexagonal tiling
Snub hexagonal tiling
Elongated triangular tiling

Uniform polyhedra

 Regular polyhedron
 Platonic solid
 Tetrahedron
 Cube
 Octahedron
 Dodecahedron
 Icosahedron
 Kepler–Poinsot polyhedron (regular star polyhedra)
 Great icosahedron
 Small stellated dodecahedron
 Great dodecahedron
 Great stellated dodecahedron
 Abstract regular polyhedra (Projective polyhedron)
 Hemicube
 Hemi-octahedron
 Hemi-dodecahedron
 Hemi-icosahedron
 Archimedean solid
 Truncated tetrahedron
 Cuboctahedron
 Truncated cube
 Truncated octahedron
 Rhombicuboctahedron
 Truncated cuboctahedron
 Snub cube
 Icosidodecahedron
 Truncated dodecahedron
 Truncated icosahedron
 Rhombicosidodecahedron
 Truncated icosidodecahedron
 Snub dodecahedron
Prismatic uniform polyhedron
 Prism
 Antiprism

 Uniform star polyhedron

Cubitruncated cuboctahedron
Cubohemioctahedron
Ditrigonal dodecadodecahedron
Dodecadodecahedron
Great cubicuboctahedron
Great dirhombicosidodecahedron
Great disnub dirhombidodecahedron
Great ditrigonal dodecicosidodecahedron
Great ditrigonal icosidodecahedron
Great dodecahemicosahedron
Great dodecahemidodecahedron
Great dodecicosahedron
Great dodecicosidodecahedron
Great icosicosidodecahedron
Great icosidodecahedron
Great icosihemidodecahedron
Great inverted snub icosidodecahedron
Great retrosnub icosidodecahedron
Great rhombidodecahedron
Great rhombihexahedron
Great snub dodecicosidodecahedron
Great snub icosidodecahedron
Great stellated truncated dodecahedron
Great truncated cuboctahedron
Great truncated icosidodecahedron
Icosidodecadodecahedron
Icositruncated dodecadodecahedron
Inverted snub dodecadodecahedron
Nonconvex great rhombicosidodecahedron
Nonconvex great rhombicuboctahedron
Octahemioctahedron
Rhombicosahedron
Rhombidodecadodecahedron
Small cubicuboctahedron
Small ditrigonal dodecicosidodecahedron
Small ditrigonal icosidodecahedron
Small dodecahemicosahedron
Small dodecahemidodecahedron
Small dodecicosahedron
Small dodecicosidodecahedron
Small icosicosidodecahedron
Small icosihemidodecahedron
Small retrosnub icosicosidodecahedron
Small rhombidodecahedron
Small rhombihexahedron
Small snub icosicosidodecahedron
Small stellated truncated dodecahedron
Snub dodecadodecahedron
Snub icosidodecadodecahedron
Stellated truncated hexahedron
Tetrahemihexahedron
Truncated dodecadodecahedron
Truncated great dodecahedron
Truncated great icosahedron

Duals of uniform polyhedra
 Catalan solid
 Triakis tetrahedron
 Rhombic dodecahedron
 Triakis octahedron
 Tetrakis hexahedron
 Deltoidal icositetrahedron
 Disdyakis dodecahedron
 Pentagonal icositetrahedron
 Rhombic triacontahedron
 Triakis icosahedron
 Pentakis dodecahedron
 Deltoidal hexecontahedron
 Disdyakis triacontahedron
 Pentagonal hexecontahedron

 non-convex
Great complex icosidodecahedron
Great deltoidal hexecontahedron
Great deltoidal icositetrahedron
Great dirhombicosidodecacron
Great dirhombicosidodecahedron
Great disdyakis dodecahedron
Great disdyakis triacontahedron
Great disnub dirhombidodecacron
Great ditrigonal dodecacronic hexecontahedron
Great dodecacronic hexecontahedron
Great dodecahemicosacron
Great dodecicosacron
Great hexacronic icositetrahedron
Great hexagonal hexecontahedron
Great icosacronic hexecontahedron
Great icosihemidodecacron
Great inverted pentagonal hexecontahedron
Great pentagonal hexecontahedron
Great pentagrammic hexecontahedron
Great pentakis dodecahedron
Great rhombic triacontahedron
Great rhombidodecacron
Great rhombihexacron
Great stellapentakis dodecahedron
Great triakis icosahedron
Great triakis octahedron
Great triambic icosahedron
Medial deltoidal hexecontahedron
Medial disdyakis triacontahedron
Medial hexagonal hexecontahedron
Medial icosacronic hexecontahedron
Medial inverted pentagonal hexecontahedron
Medial pentagonal hexecontahedron
Medial rhombic triacontahedron
Hexahemioctacron
Hemipolyhedron
Octahemioctacron
Rhombicosacron
Small complex icosidodecahedron
Small ditrigonal dodecacronic hexecontahedron
Small dodecacronic hexecontahedron
Small dodecahemicosacron
Small dodecahemidodecacron
Small dodecicosacron
Small hexacronic icositetrahedron
Small hexagonal hexecontahedron
Small hexagrammic hexecontahedron
Small icosacronic hexecontahedron
Small icosihemidodecacron
Small rhombidodecacron
Small rhombihexacron
Small stellapentakis dodecahedron
Small triambic icosahedron
Tetrahemihexacron

Johnson solids

Augmented dodecahedron
Augmented hexagonal prism
Augmented pentagonal prism
Augmented sphenocorona
Augmented triangular prism
Augmented tridiminished icosahedron
Augmented truncated cube
Augmented truncated dodecahedron
Augmented truncated tetrahedron
Biaugmented pentagonal prism
Biaugmented triangular prism
Biaugmented truncated cube
Bigyrate diminished rhombicosidodecahedron
Bilunabirotunda
Diminished rhombicosidodecahedron
Disphenocingulum
Elongated pentagonal bipyramid
Elongated pentagonal cupola
Elongated pentagonal gyrobicupola
Elongated pentagonal gyrobirotunda
Elongated pentagonal gyrocupolarotunda
Elongated pentagonal orthobicupola
Elongated pentagonal orthobirotunda
Elongated pentagonal orthocupolarotunda
Elongated pentagonal pyramid
Elongated pentagonal rotunda
Elongated square bipyramid
Elongated square cupola
Elongated square gyrobicupola
Elongated square pyramid
Elongated triangular bipyramid
Elongated triangular cupola
Elongated triangular gyrobicupola
Elongated triangular orthobicupola
Elongated triangular pyramid
Gyrate bidiminished rhombicosidodecahedron
Gyrate rhombicosidodecahedron
Gyrobifastigium
Gyroelongated pentagonal bicupola
Gyroelongated pentagonal birotunda
Gyroelongated pentagonal cupola
Gyroelongated pentagonal cupolarotunda
Gyroelongated pentagonal pyramid
Gyroelongated pentagonal rotunda
Gyroelongated square bicupola
Gyroelongated square bipyramid
Gyroelongated square cupola
Gyroelongated square pyramid
Gyroelongated triangular bicupola
Gyroelongated triangular cupola
Hebesphenomegacorona
Metabiaugmented dodecahedron
Metabiaugmented hexagonal prism
Metabiaugmented truncated dodecahedron
Metabidiminished icosahedron
Metabidiminished rhombicosidodecahedron
Metabigyrate rhombicosidodecahedron
Metagyrate diminished rhombicosidodecahedron
Parabiaugmented dodecahedron
Parabiaugmented hexagonal prism
Parabiaugmented truncated dodecahedron
Parabidiminished rhombicosidodecahedron
Parabigyrate rhombicosidodecahedron
Paragyrate diminished rhombicosidodecahedron
Pentagonal bipyramid
Pentagonal cupola
Pentagonal gyrobicupola
Pentagonal gyrocupolarotunda
Pentagonal orthobicupola
Pentagonal orthobirotunda
Pentagonal orthocupolarotunda
Pentagonal pyramid
Pentagonal rotunda
Snub disphenoid
Snub square antiprism
Sphenocorona
Sphenomegacorona
Square cupola
Square gyrobicupola
Square orthobicupola
Square pyramid
Triangular bipyramid
Triangular cupola
Triangular hebesphenorotunda
Triangular orthobicupola
Triaugmented dodecahedron
Triaugmented hexagonal prism
Triaugmented triangular prism
Triaugmented truncated dodecahedron
Tridiminished icosahedron
Tridiminished rhombicosidodecahedron
Trigyrate rhombicosidodecahedron

Other nonuniform polyhedra
Pyramid
Bipyramid
Disphenoid
Parallelepiped
 Cuboid
 Rhombohedron
 Trapezohedron
 Frustum
 Trapezo-rhombic dodecahedron
 Rhombo-hexagonal dodecahedron
Truncated trapezohedron
Deltahedron
Zonohedron
Prismatoid
Cupola
Bicupola

Spherical polyhedra

Dihedron
Hosohedron

Honeycombs
Convex uniform honeycomb

Cubic honeycomb
Truncated cubic honeycomb
Bitruncated cubic honeycomb
Cantellated cubic honeycomb
Cantitruncated cubic honeycomb
Rectified cubic honeycomb
Runcitruncated cubic honeycomb
Omnitruncated cubic honeycomb
Tetrahedral-octahedral honeycomb
Truncated alternated cubic honeycomb
Cantitruncated alternated cubic honeycomb
Runcinated alternated cubic honeycomb
Quarter cubic honeycomb
Gyrated tetrahedral-octahedral honeycomb
Gyrated triangular prismatic honeycomb
Gyroelongated alternated cubic honeycomb
Gyroelongated triangular prismatic honeycomb
Elongated triangular prismatic honeycomb
Elongated alternated cubic honeycomb
Hexagonal prismatic honeycomb
Triangular prismatic honeycomb
Triangular-hexagonal prismatic honeycomb
Truncated hexagonal prismatic honeycomb
Truncated square prismatic honeycomb
Rhombitriangular-hexagonal prismatic honeycomb
Omnitruncated triangular-hexagonal prismatic honeycomb
Snub triangular-hexagonal prismatic honeycomb
Snub square prismatic honeycomb

Dual uniform honeycomb
Disphenoid tetrahedral honeycomb
Rhombic dodecahedral honeycomb

Others
Trapezo-rhombic dodecahedral honeycomb
Weaire–Phelan structure

Convex uniform honeycombs in hyperbolic space
Order-4 dodecahedral honeycomb
Order-5 cubic honeycomb
Order-5 dodecahedral honeycomb
Icosahedral honeycomb

Other

Apeirogonal prism
Apeirohedron
Bicupola
Cupola
Bifrustum
Boerdijk–Coxeter helix
Császár polyhedron
Flexible polyhedron
Gyroelongated square dipyramid
Heronian tetrahedron
Hexagonal bifrustum
Hexagonal truncated trapezohedron
Hill tetrahedron
Holyhedron
Infinite skew polyhedron
Jessen's icosahedron
Near-miss Johnson solid
Parallelepiped
Pentagonal bifrustum
Polytetrahedron
Pyritohedron
Rhombic enneacontahedron
Rhombic icosahedron
Rhombo-hexagonal dodecahedron
Rhombohedron
Scalenohedron
Schönhardt polyhedron
Square bifrustum
Square truncated trapezohedron
Szilassi polyhedron
Tetradecahedron
Tetradyakis hexahedron
Tetrated dodecahedron
Triangular bifrustum
Triaugmented triangular prism
Truncated rhombic dodecahedron
Truncated trapezohedron
Truncated triakis tetrahedron
Tridyakis icosahedron
Trigonal trapezohedron
Regular skew polyhedron
Waterman polyhedron
Wedge

Regular and uniform compound polyhedra
Polyhedral compound and Uniform polyhedron compound

Compound of cube and octahedron
Compound of dodecahedron and icosahedron
Compound of eight octahedra with rotational freedom
Compound of eight triangular prisms
Compound of five cubes
Compound of five cuboctahedra
Compound of five cubohemioctahedra
Compound of five great cubicuboctahedra
Compound of five great dodecahedra
Compound of five great icosahedra
Compound of five great rhombihexahedra
Compound of five icosahedra
Compound of five octahedra
Compound of five octahemioctahedra
Compound of five small cubicuboctahedra
Compound of five small rhombicuboctahedra
Compound of five small rhombihexahedra
Compound of five small stellated dodecahedra
Compound of five stellated truncated cubes
Compound of five tetrahedra
Compound of five tetrahemihexahedra
Compound of five truncated cubes
Compound of five truncated tetrahedra
Compound of five uniform great rhombicuboctahedra
Compound of four hexagonal prisms
Compound of four octahedra
Compound of four octahedra with rotational freedom
Compound of four tetrahedra
Compound of four triangular prisms
Compound of great icosahedron and great stellated dodecahedron
Compound of six cubes with rotational freedom
Compound of six decagonal prisms
Compound of six decagrammic prisms
Compound of six pentagonal prisms
Compound of six pentagrammic crossed antiprisms
Compound of six pentagrammic prisms
Compound of six tetrahedra
Compound of six tetrahedra with rotational freedom
Compound of small stellated dodecahedron and great dodecahedron
Compound of ten hexagonal prisms
Compound of ten octahedra
Compound of ten tetrahedra
Compound of ten triangular prisms
Compound of ten truncated tetrahedra
Compound of three cubes
Compound of three tetrahedra
Compound of twelve pentagonal antiprisms with rotational freedom
Compound of twelve pentagonal prisms
Compound of twelve pentagrammic prisms
Compound of twelve tetrahedra with rotational freedom
Compound of twenty octahedra
Compound of twenty octahedra with rotational freedom
Compound of twenty tetrahemihexahedra
Compound of twenty triangular prisms
Compound of two great dodecahedra
Compound of two great icosahedra
Compound of two great inverted snub icosidodecahedra
Compound of two great retrosnub icosidodecahedra
Compound of two great snub icosidodecahedra
Compound of two icosahedra
Compound of two inverted snub dodecadodecahedra
Compound of two small stellated dodecahedra
Compound of two snub cubes
Compound of two snub dodecadodecahedra
Compound of two snub dodecahedra
Compound of two snub icosidodecadodecahedra
Compound of two truncated tetrahedra
Prismatic compound of antiprisms
Prismatic compound of antiprisms with rotational freedom
Prismatic compound of prisms
Prismatic compound of prisms with rotational freedom

4-polytope
Hecatonicosachoron
Hexacosichoron
Hexadecachoron
Icositetrachoron
Pentachoron
Tesseract
Spherical cone
Convex regular 4-polytope
5-cell, Tesseract, 16-cell, 24-cell, 120-cell, 600-cell

Abstract regular polytope
11-cell, 57-cell

Schläfli–Hess 4-polytope (Regular star 4-polytope)
Icosahedral 120-cell, Small stellated 120-cell, Great 120-cell, Grand 120-cell, Great stellated 120-cell, Grand stellated 120-cell, Great grand 120-cell, Great icosahedral 120-cell, Grand 600-cell, Great grand stellated 120-cell

Uniform 4-polytope
Rectified 5-cell, Truncated 5-cell, Cantellated 5-cell, Runcinated 5-cell
Rectified tesseract, Truncated tesseract, Cantellated tesseract, Runcinated tesseract
Rectified 16-cell, Truncated 16-cell
Rectified 24-cell, Truncated 24-cell, Cantellated 24-cell, Runcinated 24-cell, Snub 24-cell
Rectified 120-cell, Truncated 120-cell, Cantellated 120-cell, Runcinated 120-cell
Rectified 600-cell, Truncated 600-cell, Cantellated 600-cell

Prismatic uniform polychoron
Grand antiprism
Duoprism
Tetrahedral prism, Truncated tetrahedral prism
Truncated cubic prism, Truncated octahedral prism, Cuboctahedral prism, Rhombicuboctahedral prism, Truncated cuboctahedral prism, Snub cubic prism
Truncated dodecahedral prism, Truncated icosahedral prism, Icosidodecahedral prism, Rhombicosidodecahedral prism, Truncated icosidodecahedral prism, Snub dodecahedral prism
Uniform antiprismatic prism

Honeycombs
Tesseractic honeycomb
24-cell honeycomb
Snub 24-cell honeycomb
Rectified 24-cell honeycomb
Truncated 24-cell honeycomb
16-cell honeycomb
5-cell honeycomb
Omnitruncated 5-cell honeycomb
Truncated 5-cell honeycomb
Omnitruncated 5-simplex honeycomb

5D with 4D surfaces
regular 5-polytope
5-dimensional cross-polytope
5-dimensional hypercube 
5-dimensional simplex
Five-dimensional space, 5-polytope and uniform 5-polytope
5-simplex, Rectified 5-simplex, Truncated 5-simplex, Cantellated 5-simplex, Runcinated 5-simplex, Stericated 5-simplex
5-demicube, Truncated 5-demicube, Cantellated 5-demicube, Runcinated 5-demicube
5-cube, Rectified 5-cube, 5-cube, Truncated 5-cube, Cantellated 5-cube, Runcinated 5-cube, Stericated 5-cube
5-orthoplex, Rectified 5-orthoplex, Truncated 5-orthoplex, Cantellated 5-orthoplex, Runcinated 5-orthoplex

Prismatic uniform 5-polytope For each polytope of dimension n, there is a prism of dimension n+1.

Honeycombs
5-cubic honeycomb
5-simplex honeycomb
Truncated 5-simplex honeycomb
5-demicubic honeycomb

Six dimensions
Six-dimensional space, 6-polytope and uniform 6-polytope
6-simplex, Rectified 6-simplex, Truncated 6-simplex, Cantellated 6-simplex, Runcinated 6-simplex, Stericated 6-simplex, Pentellated 6-simplex
6-demicube, Truncated 6-demicube, Cantellated 6-demicube, Runcinated 6-demicube, Stericated 6-demicube
6-cube, Rectified 6-cube, 6-cube, Truncated 6-cube, Cantellated 6-cube, Runcinated 6-cube, Stericated 6-cube, Pentellated 6-cube
6-orthoplex, Rectified 6-orthoplex, Truncated 6-orthoplex, Cantellated 6-orthoplex, Runcinated 6-orthoplex, Stericated 6-orthoplex
122 polytope, 221 polytope

Honeycombs
6-cubic honeycomb
6-simplex honeycomb
6-demicubic honeycomb
222 honeycomb

Seven dimensions
Seven-dimensional space, uniform 7-polytope
7-simplex, Rectified 7-simplex, Truncated 7-simplex, Cantellated 7-simplex, Runcinated 7-simplex, Stericated 7-simplex, Pentellated 7-simplex, Hexicated 7-simplex
7-demicube, Truncated 7-demicube, Cantellated 7-demicube, Runcinated 7-demicube, Stericated 7-demicube, Pentellated 7-demicube
7-cube, Rectified 7-cube, 7-cube, Truncated 7-cube, Cantellated 7-cube, Runcinated 7-cube, Stericated 7-cube, Pentellated 7-cube, Hexicated 7-cube
7-orthoplex, Rectified 7-orthoplex, Truncated 7-orthoplex, Cantellated 7-orthoplex, Runcinated 7-orthoplex, Stericated 7-orthoplex, Pentellated 7-orthoplex
132 polytope, 231 polytope, 321 polytope

Honeycombs
7-cubic honeycomb
7-demicubic honeycomb
331 honeycomb, 133 honeycomb

Eight dimension
Eight-dimensional space, uniform 8-polytope
8-simplex, Rectified 8-simplex, Truncated 8-simplex, Cantellated 8-simplex, Runcinated 8-simplex, Stericated 8-simplex, Pentellated 8-simplex, Hexicated 8-simplex, Heptellated 8-simplex
8-orthoplex, Rectified 8-orthoplex, Truncated 8-orthoplex, Cantellated 8-orthoplex, Runcinated 8-orthoplex, Stericated 8-orthoplex, Pentellated 8-orthoplex, Hexicated 8-orthoplex
8-cube, Rectified 8-cube, Truncated 8-cube, Cantellated 8-cube, Runcinated 8-cube, Stericated 8-cube, Pentellated 8-cube, Hexicated 8-cube, Heptellated 8-cube
8-demicube, Truncated 8-demicube, Cantellated 8-demicube, Runcinated 8-demicube, Stericated 8-demicube, Pentellated 8-demicube, Hexicated 8-demicube
142 polytope, 241 polytope, 421 polytope, Truncated 421 polytope, Truncated 241 polytope, Truncated 142 polytope, Cantellated 421 polytope, Cantellated 241 polytope, Runcinated 421 polytope

Honeycombs
8-cubic honeycomb
8-demicubic honeycomb
521 honeycomb, 251 honeycomb, 152 honeycomb

Nine dimensions
9-polytope
9-cube
9-demicube
9-orthoplex
9-simplex

Hyperbolic honeycombs
E9 honeycomb

Ten dimensions
10-polytope
10-cube
10-demicube
10-orthoplex
10-simplex

Dimensional families
Regular polytope and List of regular polytopes
Simplex
Hypercube
Cross-polytope
Uniform polytope
Demihypercube
Uniform 1k2 polytope
Uniform 2k1 polytope
Uniform k21 polytope

Honeycombs
Hypercubic honeycomb
Alternated hypercubic honeycomb

Geometry

Triangle
Automedian triangle
Delaunay triangulation
Equilateral triangle
Golden triangle
Hyperbolic triangle (non-Euclidean geometry)
Isosceles triangle
Kepler triangle
Reuleaux triangle
Right triangle
Sierpinski triangle  (fractal geometry)
Special right triangles
Spiral of Theodorus
Thomson cubic
Triangular bipyramid
Triangular prism
Triangular pyramid
Triangular tiling

Geometry and other areas of mathematics 

 Annulus
 Apollonian circles
 Apollonian gasket
 Arbelos
 Borromean rings
 Circle
 Circular sector
 Circular segment
 Cyclic quadrilateral
 Cycloid
 Epitrochoid
 Epicycloid
 Cardioid
 Nephroid
 Deferent and epicycle
 Ex-tangential quadrilateral
 Horocycle
 Hypotrochoid
 Hypocycloid
 Astroid
 Deltoid curve
 Lune
 Pappus chain
 Peaucellier–Lipkin linkage
 Robbins pentagon
 Salinon
 Semicircle
 Squircle
 Steiner chain
 Tangential quadrilateral
 Bicentric quadrilateral

Glyphs and symbols

 Borromean rings
 Crescent
 Vesica piscis
 Arc
 Caustic
 Cissoid
 Conchoid
 Cubic Hermite curve
 Curve of constant width
 hedgehog
 Parametric curve
 Bézier curve
 Spline
 Hermite spline
 Beta spline
 B-spline
 Higher-order spline
 NURBS
 Ray
 Reuleaux triangle
 Ribaucour curve

References

Mathematical